Eithne Strong (née O'Connell, 1923–1999) was a bilingual Irish poet and writer who wrote in both Irish and English. Her first poems in Irish were published in Combhar and An Glor 1943-44 under the name Eithne Ni Chonaill. She was a founder member of the Runa Press whose early Chapbooks featured artwork by among others Jack B. Yeats, Sean Keating, Sean O'Sullivan, Harry Kernoff among others. The press was noted for the publication in 1943 of Marrowbone Lane by Robert Collis which depicts the fierce fighting that took place during the Easter Rising of 1916.

Life and work
Strong was born in Glensharrold, County Limerick to school teachers, John and Kathleen (Lennon) O'Connell. She went to the Irish speaking school Coláiste Muire, Ennis. Strong moved to Dublin but was not able to afford college at the time. She worked in the Civil Service for a year.

She met her husband while in Dublin. Psychoanalyst Rupert Strong was twelve years her senior and though against the wishes of her family she stayed there and married him on 12 November 1943. They had nine children the last of whom required full-time care due to a mental handicap.

She went to Trinity College, Dublin in her forties where she got a B.A in 1973. She was encouraged and admired in her poetry by Robert Graves, Bertrand Russell, Brendan Kennelly, Padraic Colum, Hilton Edwards, Bernard Share, John B. Keane and Kevin Casey . She participated in publishing, freelance journalism, teaching, work with the media. She taught creative writing and represented Irish writing in Europe: Denmark, France, Germany, Finland, England, the USA and Canada. Her poetry and short stories have been published widely in magazines, literary pages and anthologies in Ireland and overseas including North America: Canadian Journal of Irish Studies, North Dakota Quarterly, Midland Review, The Thinker Review. In Spring 1994, she read in New York City before the American Conference for Irish Studies and to members of Conradh na Gaeilge in Washington. Her books include five of poetry in Irish.

Author and poet Mary O'Donnell in her foreword-essay to Strong's poems suggested that "diversity of thought and impulse makes these poems radiate humanity, belief and a revelatory sense of justice." The editor of Poethead Wordpress, Christine Elizabeth Murray has linked the poetry of Patrick Kavanagh, Padraic Colum and Eithne Strong, describing their work "as an example of the triumph of art and literature providing an amazing root-system for new writers in terms of earthly estate, land and language".

In 1991 she won the Kilkenny Design Award for Flesh – The Greatest Sin.  She was a member of Aosdána. She died in Monkstown, Dublin in 1999.

The Dún Laoghaire Annual Book Festival,'Mountains to the Sea' awards the Rupert & Eithne Strong Poetry Prize now the Strong/Shine Award made possible by the generous support of Shine, the national organisation dedicated to the needs of those affected by mental ill health.  On International Women's Day 2000, an event was held to commemorate the life and work of Eithne Strong at the Irish Writer's Centre, Parnell Square, Dublin  and a room was named in her honour in 2012. Her manuscripts are stored un-cataloged at the National Library of Ireland.

Bibliography

Poetry in Irish 
 Nobel (Coiscéim 1999)
 Cirt Oibre (Coiscéim 1980)
 Fuil agus Fallaí (Coiscéim 1983)
 Aoife faoi Ghlas (BAC: Coiscéim 1990)
 An Sagart Pinc (Coiscéim 1990)

Poetry in English
 Poetry Quatros. Dublin: Runa, 1943–45
 Tidings. Dolmen for Runa (1958)
 Songs of Living (1961)
 Sarah, in Passing (Dublin: Dolmen 1974), (Illustrated by John Hodge)
 Flesh – The Greatest Sin (Dublin: Runa Press 1980)
 My Darling Neighbour (Belfast: Beaver Row Press 1985)
 Let Live (Galway: Salmon Publ. Co. 1990)
 Spatial Nosing: New and Selected Poems.  (Galway: Salmon Poetry, 1993)

Fiction 
 Degrees of Kindred (Tansy Books 1979), novel
 Patterns  and other Stories (Poolbeg 1981) 
 The Love Riddle (Attic Press 1993), novel

Other writings
 "Mullaghareirk: Aspects in Perspective". Author writes about her youth in the Eire-Ireland Review, ed. Michael O'Siadhail
 'Thomas Mann Country' in Poetry Ireland Review, ed. Michael O'Siadhail

Translation
 ‘Tetrach of Galilee’,  translated by Eithne Strong in The Finest Stories of Padraic Ó Conaire, 15 short stories, with other writers (Dublin, Poolbeg 1982)  32-45

Criticism
 Bertram, Vicki. ed. Kicking Daffodils: Twentieth Century Women Poets. Smyth, Ailbhe .Dodging Around the Grand Piano: Sex, Politics and Contemporary Irish Women's Poetry. Edinburgh University Press, 1997. 56–83.
 Clifton, Harry. Available Air: The Role of Women in Contemporary Irish Poetry 1975–1985. Krino, No. 7, 1989, pp. 20–30.
 Colum, Padraic. Introduction to Songs of Living, Dublin: Runa, 1961, 7 -8.
 Consalvo, Deborah Mcwilliams. Review of the Love Riddle. Irish Studies Review 4, no. 3 (January 1996) 52-53.
 Haberstroh, Patricia Boyle. "Eithne Strong" in Women Creating Women: Contemporary Irish Women Poets. Syracuse, NY: Syracuse University Press, 2001.
 Haberstroh, Patricia Boyle. ed. My Self, My Muse: Irish Women Poets Reflect on Life and Art. Syracuse, NY: Syracuse University Press, 2001.
 Heininger, Joseph, Eithne Strong in Gonzalez, Alexander, (ed.) Irish Women Writers: an A to Z Guide, Greenwood, 2006, pp. 303–8.
 O'Donnell, Mary. "Introduction". In Spatial Nosing: New and Selected Poems. Galway: Salmon, 1993
 O'Dushlaine Tadgh. Southword, Vol, 2, No.1, Winter 1999."The Magnanimous Poetry of Eithne Strong". Review of "Nobel" published by Coisceim 1998.
 McWilliams, Deborah H. Eithne Strong in Gonzalez, Alexander (ed). Modern Irish Writers: A Bio-Critical Sourcebook, Aldwych Press, London, 1997, pp. 390–93.
 Smyth, Ailbhe. ed. Wildish Things: An Anthology of New Irish Women's Writing. Attic, 1989, 1990.
 Terente, Ines Praga. A Voice of Their Own? The Role of Women in Contemporary Irish Poetry. Universidad de Valladolid Revista Alicantina de Estudios Ingleses 5 (1992): 131–41.

References

Further reading
Aherne Tom, 'Memory of Poet Still 'Strong' in Limerick Leader, 25 August 2019. "Limerick-born poet Eithne Strong led an Incredibl Life".
Brady, Anne M. and Cleeve, Brian. eds. A Biographical Dictionary of Irish Writers, The Lilliput Press, 1985, p. 229
Buck, Clare. ed. Guide to Women's Literature, Bloomsbury Publishing, 1992, p. 1052.
Buckley Megan. "Midwives to Creativity", A Study of Salmon Publishing, 1981–2007.NUI Galway Aran-access to research,item record; http://hdl.handle.net/10379/3598 , 2012.
Canadian Journal of Irish Studies,'Women and Irish Politics', Poems by Eithne Strong, pp. 146–150, July 1992, http://www.jstor.org/stable/25512904  
Casey Kevin. ed. Winter Tales from Ireland No 2.  1972. Gill and Macmillan
Campbell Fergus, 'British or Irish? Jonathan Hanaghan and the Monkstown Analysts (c.1928-1984) in Lacunae Issue 22 (pgs. 99-127), Special Themed Edition: A History of Psychoanalysis in Ireland,Ed. Eve Watson, June 2021.
Chapman 92: Irish Issue, Guest Editor: Hayden Murphy, (1999) pp.11–13
Conlon, Evelyn & Oeser, Hans-Christian. ed. Cutting the Night in Two, Short Stories by Irish  Women Writers, 'Thursday to Wednesday' by Eithne Strong,  New Island, 2001, pp. 75–88.
Conlon, Evelyn. ed. An Cloigeann Is a Luach, What Worth the Head, Co. Limerick Anthology. An Cloigeann is a Luach by Eithne Strong, 196–204,  published by Limerick County Council (1998) .
Cowman, R.. (1997). [Review of Women Creating Women: Contemporary Irish Women Poets]. The Poetry Ireland Review, (52), 107–110. Retrieved from https://www.jstor.org/stable/25578747
Crowe,Thomas Rain et al. eds. Writing The Wind: A Celtic Resurgence: The New Celtic Poetry, New Native Press, 1997, pp. 154–55.
Dunne, Sean. ed. Poets of Munster. London Anvil Press, 1985. 
Fallon,Peter. The Penguin Book of Contemporary Irish Poetry, Hardmonsworth Penguin Books, 1990.
Fitzmaurice, Gabriel and Kiberd, Declan. eds. An Crann Faoi Blath / TheFlowering Tree, Wolfhound Press 1991, pp. 110–113.
Harris, Mary N.,'Beleaguered but Determined: Irish Women Writers in Irish', Feminist Review, No. 51, (Autumn 1995), pp. 26-40, Sage Publications Inc., https://www.jstor.org>stable/1395503 
Hartman Mark,'Poetry Publications of the Runa Press', The Dublin Magazine (formerly The Dubliner), Vol.8, No.8, 1971, New Square Publications.
Heffernan, Valerie. "Mending the Torn Fragments of a Relationship" in Women: a Cultural Review, special issue, "Imagining Motherhood in the Twenty-First Century", Spring 2018, Volume 29, Number 1, ISSN 0957-4042 
Heffernan, Valerie and Wilgus, Gay. 'Imagining Motherhood in the Twenty-First Century', Chap.7.Routledge 2021.
Hogan, Robert. ed . The Macmillan Dictionary of Irish Literature, The Macmillan Press Ltd. 1980 pp. 630–31.
Housen Severin. ed. Feathers & Bones, Ten Poets of the Irish Earth,  Halcyon Press, 1981, .
Jeffries, A. Norman. ed. Irish Love Poems, O'Brien Press, Dublin, 1997.
Kiely Benedict. ed. 'The Penguin book of Irish Short Stories', 'Red Jelly' by Eithne Strong, 1981.
Lawlor Brian, ed. Encyclopedia of Ireland, Gill and Macmillan 2003.'Red Jelly ' by Eithne Strong in The Penguin Book of Irish  Short Stories, 1981
Means Wright Nancy and Hannan Dennis.Irish Literary Supplement,Vol.13, Number 1, 1 March 1994.'An Interview with Eithne Strong'. Boston College Libraries.
"Poetry in the Archive: Reflections of a Former Archivist on the Manuscripts of Twentieth-century Irish Poets in the National Library of Ireland" by Eilis Ni Duibhne in Irish University Review, Vol. 42, Issue 1, May 2012, 155–168. Describes process of acquiring one poetry archive, that of Eithne Strong . Available on-line. www.eupjournals.com/iur
Kelly, Angeline A. ed. The Pillars of the House: An Anthology of Verse by Irish Women from 1690 to the Present. Wolfhound, 1997. p. 114.'Necessity for Reverence'from the Irish.
Morgan, Jack. New World Irish: Notes on 100 Years of Lives and Letters in American Culture:The Celtic Carnivalesque'by 'Muriel Rukeyser's 'Irish Journey of Passion and Transformation.' Palgrave Macmillan, 2011, Chap. 13.
Nic Congail Riona, Nic Eoin Marin.(2018) "Writing in Irish" 1900–2013, chap.18, pp. 334–364,in 'A History of Modern iirish women's Literature', Ed; Heather ingman TCD, Cliona O'Gallchoir UCC. 
Nic Thaidhg, Andrea. The German translation of A Cheile na Triocha mBliain in Und Sucht Meine Zunge Ab ach Worten, Edition Druckhaus, Neunsehn, 1996.
O'Rourke Chris, ed, Incongnito:'Speaking with Eithne Strong',Cognito, vol.3 (Spring 1998). 
Strong, E.. (1992). Poems. The Canadian Journal of Irish Studies, 18(1), 146–150. http://doi.org/10.2307/25512904
Harmon, M.. (1985). [Review of The Non-Aligned Storyteller; A Crack in the Ice; A Bright Mask. New and Selected Poems; The Restless Factor; After Thunder; New and Selected Poems; Raven Introductions 3. New Writing from Ireland; Age of Exploration; Collected Poems, Volume I; My Darling Neighbour; The Táin; Blas Meala. A Sip from the Honey-Pot; Thomas Tranströmer, the Wild Marketplace; Collected Poems 1960-1984]. Irish University Review, 15(2), 234–243. Retrieved from https://www.jstor.org/stable/25477596
 Weekes, Ann Owens, ed. Unveiling Treasures: The Attic Guide to Irish Literary Writers, Attic Press, Dublin 1993, pp. 331–3.
 Welch, Robert. The Concise Oxford Companion to Irish Literature, Oxford University Press, 2000.
 Wilson/Somerville-Arjat. Sleeping With Monsters: Conversations with Scottish and Irish women poets, Polygon, 1990, pp. 109–119.
The White Page/An Bhileog Bhan: Twentieth Century Irish Women Poets. Salmon Publishing 1999, reprinted 2000, 2007.

External links
List of her work and works about her

FILM
 The Irish Language: A Day of Literature, Film and Song. 21 January 2017 with The Institute of Irish Studies and the University of Liverpool, London. http://www.lancepettitt.com/s/Irish-Language-and-Film-ProgrammeBriefNotes.doc
 also under News heading of http://www.lancepettit.com/projects-2017
 Seachtain na Gaeilge http://snag.ie/en/about/language-resources/irish-short-films /. Sarah Strong: I Hear Fish Drowning http://www.paulowniapictures.com/about

Writers from County Limerick
Irish women novelists
Alumni of Trinity College Dublin
1923 births
1999 deaths
Aosdána members
Irish women poets
20th-century Irish poets
20th-century Irish novelists
20th-century Irish women writers
Irish-language writers